Bibloplectus is a genus of ant-loving beetles in the family Staphylinidae. There are at least 10 described species in Bibloplectus.

Species
 Bibloplectus cherokee Chandler, 1990
 Bibloplectus chickasaw Chandler, 1990
 Bibloplectus choctaw Chandler, 1990
 Bibloplectus creek Chandler, 1990
 Bibloplectus exilis Bowman, 1934
 Bibloplectus integer (LeConte, 1878)
 Bibloplectus leviceps (Casey, 1884)
 Bibloplectus osage Chandler, 1990
 Bibloplectus ruficeps (Motschulsky, 1856)
 Bibloplectus sobrinus Casey, 1897

References

 Chandler, Donald S. (1997). "Family: Pselaphidae". A Catalog of the Coleoptera of America North of Mexico, ix + 118.
 Newton, Alfred F. Jr., and Donald S. Chandler (1989). "World Catalog of the Genera of Pselaphidae (Coleoptera)". Fieldiana: Zoology, New Series, no. 53, iv + 93.

Further reading

 Arnett, R. H. Jr., M. C. Thomas, P. E. Skelley and J. H. Frank. (eds.). (21 June 2002). American Beetles, Volume II: Polyphaga: Scarabaeoidea through Curculionoidea. CRC Press LLC, Boca Raton, Florida .
 
 Richard E. White. (1983). Peterson Field Guides: Beetles. Houghton Mifflin Company.

External links

 NCBI Taxonomy Browser, Bibloplectus

Pselaphinae